

129001–129100 

|-id=026
| 129026 Conormcmenamin ||  || Conor Brendan McMenamin (born 1989) is a student engineer at the Massachusetts Institute of Technology working as the Thermal Engineer guiding the design and stable temperature performance of the student-built Regolith X-ray Imaging Spectrometer aboard the OSIRIS-REx asteroid sample-return mission. || 
|-id=050
| 129050 Lowellcogburn ||  || Lowell Cogburn (born 1955) is lead dynamics analyst responsible for Touch and Go dynamic analysis and Sample Return Capsule release dynamic analysis for the OSIRIS-REx asteroid sample-return mission. He was the Dynamics lead on the GRAIL lunar mission. || 
|-id=051
| 129051 Chrismay ||  || Chris May (born 1972) is the Thermal Lead for the OSIRIS-REx asteroid sample-return mission. He was the Thermal Lead for the GRAIL lunar mission and thermal engineer on the Mars Phoenix lander, Mars Reconnaissance Orbiter and Mars Odyssey missions. || 
|-id=052
| 129052 Nîmeshdave ||  || Nîmesh Dave (born 1972) is the Certified Principal Engineer (CPE) for the OSIRIS-REx asteroid sample-return mission. He was the structures CPE on the GRAIL lunar mission, and mechanical design engineer on ORION and MSL Aeroshell. || 
|-id=053
| 129053 Derekshannon ||  || Derek Shannon (born 1976) is the Mechanical Analysis Lead and mechanical Certified Test Conductor for the OSIRIS-REx asteroid sample-return mission. He held the same role on the GRAIL mission, and was a stress analyst on Juno and MSL Aeroshell. || 
|-id=060
| 129060 Huntskretsch ||  || Hunts Kretsch (born 1957) is the Certified Principal Engineer for the capsule of the OSIRIS-REx asteroid sample-return mission. || 
|-id=061
| 129061 Karlfortney ||  || Karl Fortney (born 1962) is the Mechanisms Certified Principal Engineer for the OSIRIS-REx asteroid sample-return mission. He was a mechanical engineer on the MAVEN and Juno missions as well as the MSL Aeroshell. || 
|-id=063
| 129063 Joshwood ||  || Josh Wood (born 1977) is the flight system System Design Lead and CPE at Lockheed Martin for the OSIRIS-REx asteroid sample-return mission. He was also Systems/ Electrical/Payload Accommodations Engineer for the GRAIL program, and the STL lead for the Phoenix Mars Lander. || 
|-id=064
| 129064 Jeanneladewig ||  || Jeanne Ladewig (born 1957) is the flight system Payload Accommodation Lead Engineer and the TAGCAMS CPE at Lockheed Martin for the OSIRIS-REx asteroid sample-return mission and the Payload Accommodation Lead Engineer on the Juno and Phoenix missions. She has multi-mission experience working payloads on NASA interplanetary missions. || 
|-id=068
| 129068 Alexmay ||  || Alex May (born 1981) is the flight system Touch-And-Go Mission Phase Lead at Lockheed Martin for the OSIRIS-REx asteroid sample-return mission. Alex has worked on a number of missions and research programs developing proximity operations technologies within System Engineering and Guidance, Navigation and Control teams. || 
|-id=071
| 129071 Catriegle ||  || Cat Riegle (born 1976) is the flight system Contamination Control Lead at Lockheed Martin for the OSIRIS-REx asteroid sample-return mission. She has supported multiple NASA interplanetary missions helping to ensure that contamination control and planetary protection requirements are met. || 
|-id=073
| 129073 Sandyfreund ||  || Sandy Freund (born 1979) is the flight system Fault Protection Lead and Launch and SRC Release Mission Phase lead at Lockheed Martin on the OSIRIS-REx asteroid sample-return mission. She was the fault protection lead on MAVEN and was a mission operations development lead on the Phoenix Mission's EDL critical mission phase. || 
|-id=078
| 129078 Animoo ||  || Animoo, title of artistic work by Laurent "Lillo" Steidle, Swiss geologist and painter || 
|-id=082
| 129082 Oliviabillett ||  || Olivia Billett (born 1980) is the flight system Lead Software Systems Engineer, Science Mission Phase lead and flight system CPE delegate at Lockheed Martin on the OSIRIS-REx asteroid sample-return mission. She previously served as the SSE on the MAVEN mission, and supported multiple interplanetary missions within Mission Operations. || 
|-id=092
| 129092 Snowdonia ||  || Snowdon, the highest peak in Wales || 
|-id=095
| 129095 Martyschmitzer ||  || Martin Schmitzer (born 1970) is the RF Subsystem Lead for the OSIRIS-REx asteroid sample-return mission. He served as the RF lead for the GRAIL mission, MRO and Odyssey Mars missions, and Spitzer Space Telescope and was a team member on the Stardust comet sample return mission and 1998 Mars Surveyor Program. || 
|-id=096
| 129096 Andrewleung ||  || Andrew Leung (born 1986) is the EPS ATLO Lead for the OSIRIS-REx asteroid sample-return mission. Prior to serving in this role, he was the PDDU CPE delegate, SASM and BCM Card Lead for OSIRIS-REx, and a card level electronics engineer for the ISIS airship program. || 
|-id=099
| 129099 Spoelhof ||  || William Spoelhof (1909–2008), American president of Calvin College  (Src) || 
|-id=100
| 129100 Aaronammons ||  || Aaron Ammons (born 1970) is the Command And Data Handling (C&DH) Certified Principal Engineer Lead for the OSIRIS-REx asteroid sample-return mission. He was a team member to the Advanced Programs Low Power Avionics study and on the C&DH team for the GRAIL mission. || 
|}

129101–129200 

|-
| 129101 Geoffcollyer ||  || Geoff Collyer (born 1958), Canadian computer scientist || 
|-id=102
| 129102 Charliecamarotte ||  || Charles Camarotte (born 1953) is the Lockheed Martin Power Systems Lead for the OSIRIS-REx asteroid sample-return mission. He was also the C&DH Lead for OSIRIS-REx, as well as the C&DH Lead for the Juno Mission, and a flight team member of the Tethered Satellite mission. || 
|-id=108
| 129108 Kristianwaldorff ||  || Kristian Waldorff is the flight system GN&C LIDAR CPE at Lockheed Martin for the OSIRIS-REx asteroid sample-return mission. He was a Payload Accommodation Engineer on the MAVEN mission and was on the Electrical System Engineering teams on the GRAIL and Phoenix missions. || 
|-id=114
| 129114 Oliverwalthall ||  || Oliver Walthall (born 1972) is the LIDAR algorithm subject matter expert at Lockheed Martin for the OSIRIS-REx asteroid sample-return mission. He was also a Guidance, Navigation and Control engineer on the MAVEN and Orion programs. || 
|-id=119
| 129119 Ericmuhle ||  || Eric Muhle (born 1981) is a Guidance, Navigation and Control engineer at Lockheed Martin on the OSIRIS-REx asteroid sample-return mission, responsible for momentum management. He also served in GN&C Operations at LM IS&GS. || 
|-id=125
| 129125 Chrisvoth ||  || Chris Voth (born 1965) is the Guidance, Navigation and Control Subsystem Lead for OSIRIS-REx asteroid sample-return mission and the Subsystem CPE. He was also the attitude determination lead on Juno and other Lockheed Martin SES space missions. || 
|-id=137
| 129137 Hippolochos ||  || Hippolochos, son of Antimachos, a Trojan warrior from Greek mythology. He was killed by Agamemnon. || 
|-id=138
| 129138 Williamfrost ||  || William A. Frost (born 1976) is the Lockheed Martin system test engineering lead for the OSIRIS-REx asteroid sample-return mission. Prior to serving in this role, he supported the MAVEN mission to Mars, the GRAIL lunar mission, the GLM program and the TIROS program. || 
|-id=146
| 129146 Stevenglenn ||  || Steven J. Glenn (born 1961) is the Lockheed Martin operations lead for the OSIRIS-REx asteroid sample-return mission. He has worked on many missions, including Magellan, Transfer Orbit Stage, Mars Global Surveyor, Mars Climate Orbiter, Genesis, MRO, Defense Systems, MER, MSL, GRAIL and MAVEN. || 
|-id=148
| 129148 Sheilahaggard ||  || Sheila D. Gray Haggard (born 1971) is a Lockheed Martin test engineer for the OSIRIS-REx asteroid sample-return mission, responsible for development of system verification tests. She has worked many other NASA missions including MGS, Stardust, Odyssey, Spitzer, Genesis, MRO, Grail, MAVEN and InSight. || 
|-id=149
| 129149 Richwitherspoon ||  || Richard A. Witherspoon (born 1981) is the Lockheed Martin lead electrical test conductor for the OSIRIS-REx asteroid sample-return mission. He also worked at Surrey Spacecraft Technologies. || 
|-id=151
| 129151 Angelaboggs ||  || Angela Boggs (born 1978) is the Lockheed Martin Simulation Software Lead for the OSIRIS-REx asteroid sample-return mission. She was also the Simulation Software Lead for the Mars Atmosphere and Volatile Evolution Mission. || 
|-id=152
| 129152 Jaystpierre ||  || Jay St. Pierre (born 1969) is the Lockheed Martin Guidance Navigation and Control (GNC) Flight and Simulation Software Lead for the OSIRIS-REx asteroid sample-return mission. He was the GNC Subsystem Lead on the Juno Mission and was a GNC analyst and software developer for the Mars Reconnaissance Orbiter. || 
|-id=154
| 129154 Georgesondecker ||  || George Ralph Sondecker IV (born 1986), the original Lead Student Engineer at the Massachusetts Institute of Technology || 
|-id=158
| 129158 Michaelmellman ||  || Michael J. Mellman (born 1977) is the Lockheed Martin electrical ground equipment lead and test engineer for the OSIRIS-REx asteroid sample-return mission. He was also a shop lead for an electronics laboratory and a surveyor. || 
|-id=160
| 129160 Ericpeters ||  || Eric Peters (born 1989) worked as a student engineer at Massachusetts Institute of Technology, where he designed and tested a preliminary structural model for the student-built Regolith X-ray Imaging Spectrometer aboard the OSIRIS-REx asteroid sample-return mission. || 
|-id=161
| 129161 Mykallefevre ||  || Mykal Lefevre (born 1986) is the Mission Operations System Lead for the OSIRIS-REx asteroid sample-return mission. She was also instrumental in the MAVEN Mars orbit insertion sequence development and implementation teams. || 
|-id=165
| 129165 Kevinstout ||  || Kevin Dale Stout (born 1988) worked as a student engineer at the Massachusetts Institute of Technology, where he developed a thermal design and thermal control system for the student-built Regolith X-ray Imaging Spectrometer aboard the OSIRIS-REx asteroid sample-return mission. || 
|-id=167
| 129167 Dianelambert ||  || Diane S. Doran-Lambert (born 1981) worked on the OSIRIS-REx asteroid sample-return mission as a Stereophotoclinometry Scientist contributing to the testing of mission-critical software and the development of Digital Terrain Models || 
|-id=172
| 129172 Jodizareski ||  || Jodi Zareski (born 1982) is a central member of the Lockheed Martin Mission Operations Development team for the OSIRIS-REx asteroid sample-return mission. She has been the primary operations test lead and block development engineer. || 
|-id=173
| 129173 Mattgoman ||  || Matt Goman (born 1979) is the Lockheed Martin Operations Ground System Development Lead for the OSIRIS-REx asteroid sample-return mission telemetry systems and tools. He was also Ground System Development Lead and tools engineer for the MAVEN and InSight missions. || 
|-id=176
| 129176 Gerardcarter ||  || Gerard Carter (born 1958) is the Lockheed Martin Quality Engineering Lead for the OSIRIS-REx asteroid sample-return mission. Prior to serving in this role, he was the QE Lead for the MAVEN Mars Orbiter Mission and several other deep space missions. || 
|-id=177
| 129177 Jeanneeha ||  || Jeanne Eha (born 1960) is the Lockheed Martin Lead Parts Materials and Processes (PMP) Engineer for the OSIRIS-REx asteroid sample-return mission. She was also the PMP Engineer for the MAVEN Mars Mission, the Juno and GRAIL missions. || 
|-id=185
| 129185 Jonburroughs ||  || Jonathan C. Burroughs (born 1982), the Lead Mission Assurance Engineer for the OSIRIS-REx asteroid sample-return mission. || 
|-id=186
| 129186 Joshgrindlay ||  || Jonathan E. Grindlay (born 1944), a high energy astrophysicist and Professor at the Harvard College Observatory. || 
|-id=187
| 129187 Danielalfred ||  || Daniel Alfred (born 1985) was the lead thermal engineer for the OCAMS camera system of the OSIRIS-REx asteroid sample-return mission || 
|-id=188
| 129188 Dangallagher ||  || Daniel Gallagher (born 1980) is a Multimedia Producer at NASA's Goddard Spaceflight Center. He is supporting the OSIRIS-REx asteroid sample-return mission with videos, animations and other media products || 
|-id=196
| 129196 Mitchbeiser ||  || Mitchell Beiser (born 1991) worked as a mechanical design engineer on the OSIRIS-REx asteroid sample-return mission OCAMS camera system. He is passionate about the outdoors and the night sky. || 
|}

129201–129300 

|-
| 129201 Brandenallen ||  || Branden Allen (born 1979), an astronomer at the Harvard College Observatory || 
|-id=209
| 129209 Robertburt ||  || Robert Burt (born 1964), a longtime aerospace electronics engineer at Space Dynamics Laboratory, worked as the lead detector electronics designer on the OCAMS camera system of the OSIRIS-REx asteroid sample-return mission. He was supported in this effort by his wife and five children. || 
|-id=214
| 129214 Gordoncasto ||  || Gordon Casto (born 1960), the OSIRIS-REx Visible and near InfraRed Spectrometer (OVIRS) mechanical lead, ensuring the instrument can operate properly under cryogenic conditions. || 
|-id=216
| 129216 Chloecastle ||  || Chloe Castle (born 1990) worked as a Hofstadter Analytical Services test engineer on the OCAMS camera system for the OSIRIS-REx asteroid sample-return mission, her first space mission. || 
|-id=234
| 129234 Silly ||  || Didier Silly (born 1950), French optician and amateur astronomer, friend of the discoverer Bernard Christophe || 
|-id=259
| 129259 Tapolca ||  || The town of Tapolca, birthplace of Hungarian astronomer Dorottya Szám who co-discovered this minor planet || 
|-id=277
| 129277 Jianxinchen ||  || Jianxin Chen (born 1963) worked as the OSIRIS-REx asteroid sample-return mission OCAMS Camera Control Module electronics architect and the FPGA designer. He also designed the Ion and Electron Spectrometer FPGA and controller on the Rosetta mission, and the C&DH module for the Ralph camera on New Horizons. || 
|}

129301–129400 

|-id=307
| 129307 Tomconnors ||  || Thomas Connors (born 1959) served as a lead mechanical engineer on the OSIRIS-REx asteroid sample-return mission OCAMS camera. He also worked as systems engineer on the LBTI and Kepler Technology Demonstration projects, as well as future telescope architecture studies. || 
|-id=312
| 129312 Drouetdaubigny ||  || Christian Drouet d'Aubigny (born 1972) served as the deputy instrument scientist and lead optical designer for OSIRIS-REx Asteroid Sample Return Mission OCAMS camera. He also worked on technology development for terahertz imaging radars, imaging spectrometers, and for NASA's proposed Terrestrial Planet Finder. || 
|-id=314
| 129314 Dathongolish ||  || Dathon Golish (born 1979) was the lead image analyst on the OSIRIS-REx asteroid sample-return mission OCAMS camera. He also worked on terahertz astronomical receivers for telescopes in Arizona and at the South Pole, as well as image formation software for the DARPA AWARE gigapixel camera. || 
|-id=318
| 129318 Sarahschlieder ||  || Sarah Elizabeth Schlieder (born 1995) is a science communications specialist. She worked as a Public Affairs Specialist for the OSIRIS-REx asteroid sample-return mission. || 
|-id=321
| 129321 Tannercampbell ||  || Tanner S. Campbell (born 1991) worked on the OSIRIS-REx asteroid sample-return mission as a Stereophotoclinometry Scientist and Programmer, working to test and develop the mission-critical digital terrain mapping software || 
|-id=324
| 129324 Johnweirich ||  || John R. Weirich (born 1979) is a researcher at the Planetary Science Institute. Currently his research focus is testing and preparing code that will be used to build a shape model of asteroid Bennu for the OSIRIS-REx asteroid sample-return mission. He also conducts age dating on impact-melted meteorites || 
|-id=325
| 129325 Jedhancock ||  || Jed Hancock (born 1977) served as the detector assembly lead on the OSIRIS-REx asteroid sample-return mission OCAMS camera. He was Civil Space Division director at the Utah State University Space Dynamics Laboratory and managed development of camera assemblies on NASA's Ionospheric Connect Explorer mission. || 
|-id=327
| 129327 Davehamara ||  || Dave Hamara (born 1960) served as lead electronic designer for the Camera Control Module on the OSIRIS-REx asteroid sample-return mission OCAMS camera. He worked with gamma ray and neutron instruments and data on Mars Odyssey, Mars Phoenix, Messenger and Lunar Reconnaissance Orbiter missions || 
|-id=328
| 129328 Loriharrison ||  || Lori Harrison (born 1978) worked as the Integration and Test Lead Engineer for the OSIRIS-REx asteroid sample-return mission OCAMS camera. She was a Test Engineer for the Phoenix Mars Mission. She enjoys hiking, traveling, taking pictures in space and playing the bagpipes. || 
|-id=330
| 129330 Karlharshman ||  || Karl Harshman (born 1957) served as the lead software engineer on the OCAMS camera and as the Science Processing Operations Center Manager for the OSIRIS-REx asteroid sample-return mission. || 
|-id=332
| 129332 Markhunten ||  || Mark Hunten (born 1954) worked as a senior electrical engineer on the OSIRIS-REx asteroid sample-return mission OCAMS camera. He also worked on the Gemini 8-m telescopes and the MONSOON CCD and IR array controller. || 
|-id=333
| 129333 Ashleylancaster ||  || Ashley Lancaster (born 1990) worked as a test engineer on the OSIRIS-REx asteroid sample-return mission OCAMS camera. She also worked on the ATST Solar Telescope. || 
|-id=335
| 129335 Edwardlittle ||  || Edward Little (born 1978) worked as a calibration and test engineer on the OSIRIS-REx asteroid sample-return mission OCAMS camera. He is an avid amateur astronomer and optical designer. || 
|-id=338
| 129338 Andrewlowman ||  || Andrew Lowman (born 1967) worked as an optical designer on OSIRIS-REx asteroid sample-return mission OCAMS camera. He also worked as an optical engineer on the Lick Automated Planet Finder, SkyMapper, the Magdalena Ridge telescopes and on the Optical Navigation Camera for the Mars Reconnaissance Orbiter || 
|-id=342
| 129342 Ependes ||  || The Swiss village of Épendes, located in the Canton of Fribourg || 
|}

129401–129500 

|-bgcolor=#f2f2f2
| colspan=4 align=center | 
|}

129501–129600 

|-id=550
| 129550 Fukuten ||  || Fukushima Tenmon Doukoukai is a local astronomical association with 40 members. It has hosted star-parties and photo exhibitions for Fukushima citizens since its establishment in 1968. || 
|-id=555
| 129555 Armazones ||  || Cerro Armazones, the Chilean mountain selected as location for the Extremely Large Telescope by the European Southern Observatory (ESO) in 2010 || 
|-id=561
| 129561 Chuhachi ||  || Chūhachi Ninomiya (1866–1936), the first Japanese to fly a propeller-driven model aircraft || 
|-id=564
| 129564 Christy ||  || James W. Christy (born 1938), American astronomer who discovered Pluto's moon Charon || 
|-id=595
| 129595 Vand || 1997 VD || Vladimír Vand (1911–1968), Czech astronomer and molecular spectroscopist || 
|}

129601–129700 

|-bgcolor=#f2f2f2
| colspan=4 align=center | 
|}

129701–129800 

|-id=743
| 129743 Grimaldi ||  || Francesco Maria Grimaldi (1618–1663) was one of the first telescopic observers of the Moon. He wrote De lumine, the first treatise on the wave nature of light. || 
|-id=773
| 129773 Catmerrill ||  || Catherine Merrill (born 1979) was the Lead Systems Engineer and Deputy Program Manager for the OCAMS camera on the OSIRIS-REx asteroid sample-return mission, involved in all aspects of its development and delivery. She is presently the project manager of the primary mirror system for the Giant Magellan Telescope || 
|}

129801–129900 

|-
| 129801 Tommcmahon ||  || Tom McMahon (born 1962) was electronics lead on the OCAMS camera for the OSIRIS-REx asteroid sample-return mission. He also served as project manager for the Large Binocular Telescope Interferometer and systems engineer for the Multi-band Imaging Spectrometer (MIPS) on the Spitzer Space Telescope || 
|-id=807
| 129807 Stefanodougherty ||  || Stefan O'Dougherty (born 1998) worked as a calibration and test engineer on the OCAMS camera system of the OSIRIS-REx asteroid sample-return mission. || 
|-id=811
| 129811 Stacyoliver ||  || Stacy Oliver (born 1969) worked as information technologies and documentation specialist on the OSIRIS-REx asteroid sample-return mission. || 
|-id=876
| 129876 Stevenpeterson ||  || Steven Peterson (born 1953) worked as an optical systems calibration and test engineer on the OCAMS camera of the OSIRIS-REx asteroid sample-return mission. He also worked at Kitt Peak National Observatory and served as an officer of the Tucson Amateur Astronomy Association || 
|-id=879
| 129879 Tishasaltzman ||  || Tisha Saltzman (born 1966) served as the business manager on the OCAMS camera of the OSIRIS-REx asteroid sample-return mission. She also worked on the Phoenix Mars mission SSI and Ground Operations teams || 
|-id=881
| 129881 Chucksee ||  || Charles See (born 1956) worked as a calibration and test engineer on the OCAMS camera of the OSIRIS-REx asteroid sample-return mission. He also filled many roles on the Descent Imager/Spectral Radiometer team on the Cassini-Huygens probe to Titan, including systems, calibration and test lead, and data analyst. || 
|-id=882
| 129882 Ustica || 1999 TO || Ustica, a volcanic island 70 km north of Palermo, Sicily, famous for being the first Marine Protected Area in Italy (1986). || 
|-id=898
| 129898 Sanfordselznick ||  || Sanford Selznick (born 1969) was the telemetry lead for the Science Processing Operations Center of the OSIRIS-REx asteroid sample-return mission. He also designed the commanding and telemetry interface used for the Mars Odyssey mission, the Mars Phoenix mission, and contributed to OSIRIS-REx OCAMS camera hardware development. || 
|}

129901–130000 

|-id=954
| 129954 Corksauve ||  || Corwynn Sauve (born 1961) was as a mechanical designer on the OCAMS camera suite of the OSIRIS-REx asteroid sample-return mission || 
|-id=955
| 129955 Eriksyrstad ||  || Erik Syrstad (born 1978) was the detector assembly contamination control lead for the OCAMS camera of the OSIRIS-REx asteroid sample-return mission. As an instrument scientist at the Utah State University Space Dynamics Laboratory, he was the program manager for the FUV spectrograph camera on NASA's ICON mission. || 
|-id=962
| 129962 Williamverts ||  || William Verts (born 1968) worked as a senior mechanical designer on the OCAMS camera of the OSIRIS-REx asteroid sample-return mission. He also helped design TEGA II on the Phoenix Mars Mission and Mars Polar Lander and GRS on the Odyssey Mars Mission || 
|-id=963
| 129963 Marvinwalthall ||  || Marvin Walthall (born 1983) worked as an optical and stray light analyst on the OCAMS camera of the OSIRIS-REx asteroid sample-return mission || 
|-id=966
| 129966 Michaelward ||  || Michael Ward (born 1964) served as the configuration manager on the OCAMS camera of the OSIRIS-REx asteroid sample-return mission. He also worked as mission operations manager for GRS on Mars Odyssey || 
|-id=968
| 129968 Mitchwhiteley ||  || Mitchell Whiteley (born 1972) designed the camera FPGA read-out electronics on the OCAMS camera of the OSIRIS-REx asteroid sample-return mission. He also designed the SOFIE Sun Tracker for NASA-AIM and served as the USURF-SDL Digital Imaging Space Camera lead || 
|-id=969
| 129969 Bradwilliams ||  || Bradley Williams (born 1989) worked as a systems engineer on the OCAMS camera of the OSIRIS-REx asteroid sample-return mission. He also worked on the Phoenix Mars mission. || 
|-id=973
| 129973 Michaeldaly ||  || Michael Daly (born 1965) is a professor of planetary science at York University and is the lead scientist for the laser altimeter of the OSIRIS-REx asteroid sample-return mission. Prior to this, he was the lead engineer for the development of Phoenix MET, Canada's first instruments to operate on the surface of Mars. || 
|-id=980
| 129980 Catherinejohnson ||  || Catherine Johnson (born 1967) is a planetary geophysicist and a Co-Investigator for the OSIRIS-REx asteroid sample-return mission and for the InSight mission to Mars. She was a Participating Scientist on the MESSENGER mission to Mercury and is a Fellow of the American Geophysical Union || 
|-id=982
| 129982 Jeffseabrook ||  || Jeff Seabrook (born 1976) is part of the altimetry team developing the capability to generate topography and shape models from the laser altimeter of the OSIRIS-REx asteroid sample-return mission. Prior to this, he was a graduate student who developed and deployed atmospheric ozone lidars, and part of the MET team on the Phoenix Mars Mission. || 
|-id=985
| 129985 Jimfreemantle ||  || Jim Freemantle (born 1958) is the Project Manager for the OLA Science Team on the OSIRIS-REx asteroid sample-return mission. He was also the Project Manager for the Canadian MET Sensor on board the Phoenix Mars Lander. He has had a long career using remote sensing to monitor environmental change || 
|-id=988
| 129988 Camerondickinson ||  || Cameron S. Dickinson (born 1974) is the Technical Lead for the laser altimeter of the OSIRIS-REx asteroid sample-return mission. Previously, Cameron was the Operations Lead for the Phoenix Mars Lander Meteorological Station || 
|}

References 

129001-130000